Pleurotomella bathybia is a species of sea snail, a marine gastropod mollusk in the family Raphitomidae.

Description
The length of the shell attains 6.5 mm.

Distribution
This marine species occurs off South Georgia Island & South Sandwich Islands at depths between 94 m - 310 m.

References

 Strebel, Dr. H., die Gastropoden. In : Wissenschaftliche Ergebnisse der Schwedischen Südpolar-Expedition 1901 — 1903 unter Leitung von Dr. Otto Nordenskjöld, Band VI, Lfg. 1. - Mit 6 Tafeln.
 Engl, W. (2012). Shells of Antarctica. Hackenheim: Conchbooks. 402 pp.

External links
 
 Nordenskjèold, Otto (1920), Wissenchaftliche ergebnisse der Schwedischen sèudpolar-expedition 1901-1903; monograph Bd.6=Zoologie 2 (1920); tockholm : Lithographisches institut des Generalstabs, 1920 related/Analytical: Ergehnisse, Wissenschaftliche
 Griffiths, H.J.; Linse, K.; Crame, J.A. (2003). SOMBASE - Southern Ocean mollusc database: a tool for biogeographic analysis in diversity and evolution. Organisms Diversity and Evolution. 3: 207-213
 Diego G. Zelaya, Systematics and biogeography of marine gastropod molluscs from South Georgia; Spixiana volume: 28 pages: 109--139 date: 2005

bathybia
Gastropods described in 1908